Harun Thohir or Harun Bin Said (birth name Tahir Bin Mandir; 1943–1968) was an Indonesian soldier born in Bawean Island, East Java, on 4 April 1943 to Mahdar and Aswiyani, while another source stated that he was born on 14 April 1943.

He was one of a three-member special forces team part of the Indonesian Marine Corps (the others being Usman bin Haji Muhammad Ali, alias "Janatin" and Gani Bin Arup) whom carried out the MacDonald House bombing in Singapore during the Indonesia-Malaysia Confrontation that killed three civilians, and following his capture, he was hanged for murder.

Name
Although his real name was Tahir bin Mandar, during the sabotage mission in Singapore, he used a false name, "Harun Bin Said". The false name of "Harun Bin Said" was given by Harun's team leader Captain Paulus Subekti

Military career
Harun joined the Indonesian Marines in June 1964 and after five months training in Riau, he was promoted to lance corporal in 1965 and assigned to the Brahma Team I with Base II-A, in Riau, under the Supreme High Command (KOTI). The team leader was Captain Paulus Subekti

The team was tasked to carry out sabotage operations against Malaya, now Malaysia, of which Singapore was a part of, during the Indonesia-Malaysia Confrontation  of 1963-1965. Harun was later stationed at Sambu Island, Batam, Riau province, Indonesia, from where the team infiltrated Singapore on 7 March 1965 with 12 kilograms of explosives.

MacDonald House Bombing and Capture
Usman and Harun were instructed to bomb an electricity power station by their superiors but finding the facility tightly guarded, they were unable to accomplish that mission and proceeded to find an easier target - an office building crowded with workers and the general public in Orchard Road.

The team detonated a 12-kilogram high explosive, placed inside a blue "Malaysian Airways" traveling bag, inside the MacDonald House at 3:07 pm local time on 10 March 1965, killing three civilians, a Malay Muslim driver Muhammad Yasin Kesit and two Chinese women Elizabeth Susie Choo Kay Hoi and Juliet Goh Hwee Kuang, who were office staff of a bank. After completing their mission, both men tried to stow away out of Singapore on a cargo ship, but were told to get off after being identified as stowaways. Then they stole a boat and headed out towards Batam. However, the boat either encountered an accident or sunk, as they were later found by a traditional cargo ship at around 8.00am, floating clinging to a piece of wood. Usman and Harun were transferred to a Singapore marine police boat, on 13 March 1965, where they claimed that they were a fisherman and farmer but later confessed to the bombing of the MacDonald House.

Trial and execution
In court, both men were represented by Francis Seow, Senior Crown Counsel, who stated that they were "mercenary soldiers" and were paid S$350 (about US$280) to carry out their assignment.

Usman and Harun were convicted of murder, as they had been wearing civilian clothes at the time and had targeted a civilian building, and were sentenced to death by a Singapore court on 20 October 1965. Their appeals to the Federal Court of Malaysia in Kuala Lumpur on 5 October 1966, and the Privy Council in London on 29 July 1968 were rejected. The two were hanged in Changi Prison, Singapore, on 17 October 1968.

Burial and National Hero status 
Their bodies were flown back to Jakarta, and buried in the Kalibata Heroes Cemetery, Jakarta on 20 October 1968. Both of them were honored as National Heroes of Indonesia by President Suharto through Presidential Decree SK Presiden RI No.050/TK/Tahun 1968, on 17 October 1968, the same day they were hanged.
 They were posthumously promoted to their next higher rank, Usman to the rank of sergeant and Harun to corporal.

KRI Usman-Harun 359
In 2014, an Indonesian Navy Bung Tomo-class corvette was named after Harun and Usman, the KRI Usman-Harun. The name, however, caused controversy between Indonesia and Singapore, and the Singaporean government banned the ship named from berthing there or entering Singaporean waters.

Harun Tohir Airport
Bawean Airport  also named as Harun Thohir Airport, located on Bawean island, Gresik regency, East Java. It was officially opened by minister of transportation Ignasius Jonan on 30 January 2016.

See also
 Indonesia–Malaysia confrontation
 Usman Haji Muhammad Ali
 Capital punishment in Singapore
 MacDonald House bombing

References

National Heroes of Indonesia
1943 births
1968 deaths
20th-century executions by Singapore
Indonesian people executed abroad